The 2017 Città di Caltanissetta was a professional tennis tournament played on clay courts. It was the 19th edition of the tournament which was part of the 2017 ATP Challenger Tour. It took place in Caltanissetta, Italy between 12 and 18 June 2017.

Singles main-draw entrants

Seeds

 1 Rankings are as of 29 May 2017.

Other entrants
The following players received wildcards into the singles main draw:
  Simone Bolelli
  Dušan Lajović
  Paolo Lorenzi
  Gianluca Mager

The following players received entry from the qualifying draw:
  Matteo Berrettini
  Sebastian Ofner
  João Pedro Sorgi
  Cedrik-Marcel Stebe

Champions

Singles

 Paolo Lorenzi def.  Alessandro Giannessi 6–4, 6–2.

Doubles

 James Cerretani /  Max Schnur def.  Denys Molchanov /  Franko Škugor 6–3, 3–6, [10–6].

References

2017 ATP Challenger Tour
Città di Caltanissetta